Dercongal Abbey (or Holywood Abbey) was a Premonstratensian monastic community located in Dumfriesshire, Scotland.

History
The date of its foundation is not known, but it was certainly in existence as a Premonstratensian monastic community by 1225. The founder was presumably Alan, Lord of Galloway. Dercongal seems to come from Doire Congaill, Congall's oak-copse, Congall (Welsh, Cinvall) being a saint venerated by the natives of the area. For this reason the abbot of Dercongal also became known as the abbot "de Sacro Nemore" (="of the Holy Wood"), becoming "Holywood" in English.

Saint Vimin (died 579) is said to have founded Holywood Abbey.
Little of its history is known and few of the abbots of Dercongal names have survived, although a good deal of archaeological remains are extant. The abbey became secularized in the 16th century and in the beginning of the 17th century was turned into a secular lordship. The ruins of the abbey were demolished in the last quarter of the 18th century.

Hewison records that in 1912 a few fragments of the abbey and later hospital survived together with a bell from the old abbey, now located in the replacement parish church bearing the Latin inscription that translates as "John Welsh, Abbot of Holywood, caused me to be made in 1505". This author also records that the abbey Sacrum Nemus or Dercongal was built in 1141.

Sir Herbert Maxwell records that Archibald Douglas, 'Archibald the Grim', Earl of Wigtown, built a hospital at the Monastery of Holywood in gratitude for his successes, both personal and political. Archibald had previously endowed the establishment with the lands of Crossmichael and Troqueer in the Stewartry. Maxwell regards the Abbey of Holywood (Abbacia Sancti Nemoris) as being founded by Devorgilla, daughter of Alan, Lord of Galloway and mother of King John Balliol.

Grose records that a fine Gothic arch supported the oak roof and under the floor were a number of sepulchral vaults. Also stated is that the renowned medieval scholar and astronomer Johannes de Sacrobosco was once a monk at the abbey.

The RCAHMS records that in 1362 almshouses for men were set up within the abbey precincts and that in 1609 the temporal Barony of Holywood was established.

See also
 Abbot of Dercongal

References

Bibliography
 Cowan, Ian B. & Easson, David E., Medieval Religious Houses: Scotland With an Appendix on the Houses in the Isle of Man, Second Edition, (London, 1976), p. 102.
 Grose, Francis (1797). The Antiquities of Scotland. High Holborn : Hooper and Wigstead. V. 2., p. 170. 
 Hewison, James K. (1912). Cambridge County Geographies Dumfrieshire. Cambridge University Press, p. 106.
 Maxwell, Sir Herbert (1896). A History of Dumfries and Galloway. Edinburgh & London : William Blackwood and Sons, p. 118.
 Royal Commission on the Ancient and Historical Monuments of Scotland. Canmore Website - Holywood Abbey.
 Watson, W.J., The Celtic Place-Names of Scotland, (Edinburgh, 1926) reprinted, with an Introduction, full Watson bibliography and corrigenda by Simon Taylor (Edinburgh, 2004), p. 169
 Watt, D.E.R. & Shead, N.F. (eds.), The Heads of Religious Houses in Scotland from the 12th to the 16th Centuries, The Scottish Records Society, New Series, Volume 24, (Edinburgh, 2001), pp. 97–9

External links
 DFSGal, Holywood Abbey
 Video footage of Holywood Abbey 

History of Dumfriesshire
Premonstratensian monasteries in Scotland
Christian monasteries established in the 13th century
13th century in Scotland
Monasteries dissolved under the Scottish Reformation
Former Christian monasteries in Scotland